Paul Gittins is a New Zealand actor who is best known for playing Doctor Michael McKenna in Shortland Street  from 1992 to 1995 and 1998 to 1999, and he has also appeared in The End of the Golden Weather, Xena: Warrior Princess, Hercules: The Legendary Journeys, City Life, The Whole of the Moon and Maiden Voyage. He is the father of Calum Gittins.

Paul Gittins is also the presenter of "Epitaph", a program that looks at interesting epitaphs and the stories behind them. It currently airs on the Paranormal Channel in the UK.

In 2022 he was presented with a Scroll of Honour from the Variety Artists Club of New Zealand for his contribution to New Zealand entertainment.

References

External links
 

Year of birth missing (living people)
Living people
New Zealand male television actors
New Zealand television presenters
New Zealand male soap opera actors
20th-century New Zealand male actors
21st-century New Zealand male actors